In Los Angeles County:
 The Los Angeles Music Center, in Los Angeles, containing multiple pavilions.

In Monterey County:
 The Forest Theater, in Carmel-by-the-Sea, contains multiple venues.
 The Golden Bough Playhouse, in Carmel-by-the-Sea, contains multiple venues.
 The Pacific Repertory Theatre, in Carmel-by-the-Sea, operates in multiple venues.

In Napa County:
 The Lincoln Theatre in Yountville
 The Napa Valley Opera House in Napa

In Orange County
 The Orange County Performing Arts Center offers several venues.

In San Diego County:
 La Paloma Theatre

In San Benito County:
Teatro Campesino

In Santa Clara County:
 The Cantor Arts Center at Stanford University near Palo Alto
Mountain View Center for the Performing Arts in Mountain View, California

In Yolo County:
 The Mondavi Center in Davis

California
Theatres